, prov. designation: , is a trans-Neptunian object from the scattered disc, approximately  in diameter, and in a rare high-order orbital resonance ratio (4:27) with Neptune. It was discovered on 13 August 2004, by American astronomer Marc Buie at the Cerro Tololo Inter-American Observatory in Chile.

Orbit and classification 

 orbits the Sun at a distance of 35.3–184.6 AU once every 1153 years and 2 months (421,205 days; semi-major axis of 109.97 AU). Its orbit has a high eccentricity of 0.68 and an inclination of 15° with respect to the ecliptic. A first precovery was taken at Cerro Tololo in 2000, extending the body's observation arc by 4 years prior to its official discovery observation.

 reached perihelion on 5 October 2011 (JD 2455839.806). It has been classified as a highly unusual 4:27 resonant trans-Neptunian object, but also simply as a scattered disc object, or SCATNEAR, respectively, by the Deep Ecliptic Survey.

Numbering and naming 

This minor planet was numbered (184212) by the Minor Planet Center on 20 April 2008. , it has not been named.

Physical characteristics 

Based on a generic conversion from an absolute magnitude of 7.2,  measures between 100 and 220 kilometer in diameter. Johnston's Archive estimates a mean-diameter of  assuming a typical albedo of 0.09.

References

External links 
 List Of Centaurs and Scattered-Disk Objects, Minor Planet Center
 Lightcurve Database Query (LCDB), at www.minorplanet.info
 Discovery Circumstances: Numbered Minor Planets (180001)-(185000) – Minor Planet Center
 

184212
Discoveries by Marc Buie
20040813